The 2009–10 Ukrainian Premier League season was the nineteenth since its establishment and second since its reorganization. Dynamo Kyiv were the defending champions, having won their 13th league title. A total of 16 teams participated in the league, 14 of which participated in the 2008–09 season, and two of which were promoted from the Ukrainian First League.

The season began on 17 July 2009. The winter break in the season was from 13 December 2009 until 28 February 2010. The last round of the season was played on 9 May 2010.

On 5 May 2010, Shakhtar Donetsk regained the title after a 1–0 win against rivals Dynamo Kyiv.

Teams

Promoted
FC Zakarpattia Uzhhorod, champion of the 2008–09 Ukrainian First League – (returning after absence of a season)
FC Obolon Kyiv, runner-up of the 2008–09 Ukrainian First League – (returning after absence of 4 seasons)

Location map

Managers and captains

Note:
 At the start of the season, Artem Milevskyi was selected to captain the side by manager Gazzayev, but on signing Andriy Shevchenko before Round 6, club president Ihor Surkis appointed Shevchenko captaincy in the club. However, Gazzayev informed the media that Milevskyi would remain the captain and Shevchenko would be the club leader.

Managerial changes

Stadiums

Qualification to European competitions for 2010–11
 Since Ukraine finished in seventh place of the UEFA country ranking after the 2008–09 season, the league will gain one more qualification spot for 2010–11 UEFA Europa League. The Ukrainian Cup winner will now qualify for the play-off round.

Qualified teams
 After the 24th Round, both Dynamo Kyiv and Shakhtar Donetsk qualified for European football for the 2010–11 season.
 After the 26th Round, both Dynamo Kyiv and Shakhtar Donetsk qualified for 2010–11 UEFA Champions League.
 After the 27th Round, Metalist Kharkiv qualified for the 2010–11 UEFA Europa League.

 After the 28th Round, both Dnipro Dnipropetrovsk and Karpaty Lviv qualified for the 2010–11 UEFA Europa League.
 Shakhtar Donetsk captured the championship after a 1–0 win against rivals Dynamo Kyiv in the 29th Round, thus securing a place in the Champions League group stage. Dynamo Kyiv enters the Champions League third qualification round as runners up.
 Metalist Kharkiv's 4–1 away victory over Zorya Luhansk in the 29th Round secured them a third-place finish in the competition and a place in the Europa League play-off round. Also in the same round, Dnipro Dnipropetrovsk completed a 4–1 home victory against Illichivets which secured fourth-place and entry into Europa League third qualification round, since Karpaty Lviv lost 0–2 at home to Kryvbas Kryvyi Rih, leaving them in fifth place and qualification into the second qualification round.

Timeline of qualification

League table

Results

Round by round
The following table is a historic representation of the team's position in the standings after the completion of each round.

Rescheduled games
 Due to the participation of Shakhtar Donetsk in the 2009 UEFA Super Cup on 28 August 2009, their Round 5 match against Metalist Kharkiv was rescheduled to 23 September 2009 (after Round 7). Upon completion of this game Metalist moved from 6th to 5th in the standings.
 All Round 13 matches were cancelled due to a strike by the referees, delegates and inspectors from the Football Federation of Ukraine. Games were to be played 7 November and 8. The first match was played on 9 December 2009 initiating Round 16. The rest of the matches are scheduled after the winter break to be played 24 March 2010, and 7 April 2010. For historical tabulation purpose the Round-by-Round displays chronologically when the round was played and not the name used by the FPL.

Top goalscorers

Last updated: 9 May 2010

Season awards
By the competition's statute, the following awards was presented. The award presentation took place on 15 June 2010 at InterContinental in Kyiv.

The laureates of the 2009–10 UPL season were:
 Best player:  Darijo Srna (Shakhtar Donetsk)
 Best coach:  Mircea Lucescu (Shakhtar Donetsk)
 Best goalkeeper:  Andriy Pyatov (Shakhtar Donetsk)
 Best arbiter:  Viktor Shvetsov (Odesa)
 Best goalscorer:  Artem Milevskyi (Dynamo Kyiv)
 Fair play prize:  Metalurh Donetsk

Pride of flag is a club award given to the club who provided the most players for the national team and youth teams: U-21, U-19, U-17. In 2009, the award was given to Dynamo Kyiv, while the first runner-up was Shakhtar Donetsk and second – Dnipro Dnipropetrovsk. No data is available for the 2010 season.

See also
2009–10 Ukrainian Second League
2009–10 Ukrainian Premier League Reserves
2009–10 Ukrainian First League
2009–10 Ukrainian Cup
2009–10 UEFA Europa League

References

External links
 Ukrainian Football Premier League official page 
 soccerway.com

Ukrainian Premier League seasons
1